House of Prayer is a Christian denomination aligned with the conservative holiness movement. It has roots in Christian communalism, restorationism, and the Wesleyan-Holiness movement.

Background

In 1917, several  converts were made among the Churches of Christ in Christian Union (CCCU), including one of the denomination's founders, Henry C. Leeth (died 1967). Leeth started a Christian commune with Runyan. The commune consisted of a farm and a store near Urbana, Ohio.

The CCCU expelled Leeth and 13 other ministers in 1918 for holding to Runyan's teachings, which denominational leaders found to be too humanistic. At first inclined to participate in Runyan's plan for a fully integrated church community, once the leadership became fully aware of the  implications of the teaching—the scrapping of tithing, along with the complete community pooling of all members' income—the annual council of the CCCU speedily resolved that those promoting the "All Things Common" movement have their recognition as CCCU ministers revoked. Leeth became the House of Prayer's first bishop (or elder) in 1919. The movement and churches went by many names over the years in addition to House of Prayer (HP for short): All Things Common, God's Non-Sectarian Tabernacle, and simply "The Church."

Though the commune failed, the House of Prayer set up many churches and an annual camp meeting which at its peak attracted a thousand visitors per year. It published the periodicals the Herald of Perfect Christianity and Repairer of the Breach, of which no copies are extant or locatable. Its headquarters were in Washington Court House, Ohio—where a church still met .

In 1999, the denomination reported two churches and around 200 members, as well as the annual camp meeting.

House of Prayer pastors and congregants have attended the Interchurch Holiness Convention (IHC).

See also
 Holiness movement
 Communitarianism

References

External links
 Clip of congregational singing
 Local church web site

Christian denominations established in the 20th century
Evangelical denominations in North America
Holiness denominations